Acanthoderes paravetusta is a species of beetle in the family Cerambycidae. It was described by Chemsak and Hovore in 2002.

References

Acanthoderes
Beetles described in 2002